Events from the year 1772 in Poland

Incumbents
 Monarch – Stanisław II August

Events

 
 - First Partition of Poland
 - Kingdom of Galicia and Lodomeria

Births

Deaths

References

 
Years of the 18th century in Poland